Vilas Bhaurao Muttemwar (born 22 March 1949) is an Indian politician from Maharashtra belonging to the Indian National Congress who served as a member of the 7th, 8th, 10th, 12th, 13th, 14th and 15th Lok Sabha representing the Nagpur Lok Sabha constituency.

He served as the Minister of State in the Department of Rural Areas and Employment, Ministry of Rural Development and Minister of State in the Ministry of Parliamentary Affairs under Prime Minister P. V. Narasimha Rao between 1995 and 1996 and as Minister of State (Independent Charge) in the Ministry of Non-Conventional Energy Sources under Prime Minister Manmohan Singh from 23 May 2004 till 22 May 2009.

Political career
Vilas Muttemwar was elected as a member of the 7th Lok Sabha from the Nagpur Lok Sabha constituency on Indian National Congress ticket in 1980. He served as a Secretary of the Indian Youth Congress between 1980 and 1981. In the 1984 general election, he was re-elected to office. During this period, he also served as Joint Secretary of the Indian National Congress from 1985 till 1988. 

In the 1991 general election to the 10th Lok Sabha, he was re-elected from Nagpur constituency. He served as the Secretary of the Congress Parliamentary Party from 1991 till 1995. He also served as the Chairman of the Committee on Public Undertakings between 1993 and 1995. He was appointed as a minister of state in the Rao ministry in 1995 and was assigned the portfolios as Minister of State in the Department of Rural Areas and Employment of the Ministry of Rural Development and in the Ministry of Parliamentary Affairs and served till 1996.

He was elected to the 12th Lok Sabha in 1998 and subsequently to the 13th Lok Sabha in 1999, the 14th Lok Sabha in 2004 and the 15th Lok Sabha in 2009. During the 12th Lok Sabha, he served as a member of the Committee on Energy, Committee on Public Undertakings and the Committee on Private Members' Bill and Resolutions. In the 13th Lok Sabha, he was a member of the Standing Committee on Transport and Tourism, Consultative Committees of the Ministry of Railways and the Ministry of Finance. He also served as the Secretary of the Congress Parliamentary Party for a second term between 2003 and 2005.

Upon his re-election in 2004 and the victory of the Congress-led United Progressive Alliance to government, he was inducted to the union council of ministers of Prime Minister Manmohan Singh as Minister of State (Independent Charge) for Non-Conventional Energy Sources on 22 May 2004. 

In the 15th Lok Sabha, he was the Chairman of the Committee on Food, Consumer Affairs and Public Distribution; and Member of the General Purposes Committee, India-Bangladesh Parliamentary Friendship Committee and the House Committee. He contested the 2014 election to the 16th Lok Sabha from Nagpur constituency against Bharatiya Janata Party-candidate Nitin Gadkari and was defeated by 2,84,848 votes.

References

External links
 Official biographical sketch in Parliament of India website

Living people
Indian National Congress politicians
India MPs 2009–2014
India MPs 2004–2009
India MPs 1999–2004
India MPs 1998–1999
India MPs 1991–1996
India MPs 1984–1989
India MPs 1980–1984
Marathi politicians
Lok Sabha members from Maharashtra
1949 births
People from Chandrapur district
Politicians from Nagpur
Indian National Congress politicians from Maharashtra